Tut (also Romanized as Tūt; also known as ‘Abbāsīyeh) is a village in Zarrin Rural District, Kharanaq District, Ardakan County, Yazd Province, Iran. At the 2006 census, its population was 195, in 77 families.

References 

Populated places in Ardakan County